Revue des études juives  is a French quarterly academic journal of Jewish studies, established in July 1880 at the École pratique des hautes études, Paris by the Société des Études Juives. The founding editor was Isidore Loeb; after his death it was edited by Israel Lévi. The Revue des Études Juives has currently two Chief Editors, Jean-Pierre Rothschild and José Costa, whereas its Managing Editor is Peter Nahon. It is currently published by Peeters Publishers. The journal covers research and prints unpublished texts concerning Judaism, among others documents relative to the history of the French Jews. Nearly every issue also contains a special bibliographical section devoted to reviews of current works on Judaism. It is one of the oldest active scientific periodicals in the field of Jewish studies (the Jewish Quarterly Review having been founded, for instance, in 1889).

Abstracting and indexing 
The journal is abstracted and indexed in:

References

External links 
  
 Revue des Études Juives at archive.org
 

French-language journals
Judaic studies journals
Peeters Publishers academic journals
Publications established in 1880
Quarterly journals